Marcelino Solis (July 19, 1930 – June 15, 2001) was a Mexican professional baseball player, a left-handed pitcher who appeared in 15 Major League games in  for the Chicago Cubs.

Solis' professional career extended from 1952 through 1963, but the 1958 campaign was his most noteworthy. Starting the year with the Fort Worth Cats, Solis fashioned a 15–2 won–lost record and a 2.44 earned run average in the Double-A Texas League then was called up to the Cubs in July. In his MLB debut on July 16 at Wrigley Field, Solis gave up nine hits and five runs, all earned, in 6⅓ innings against the Cincinnati Redlegs, but gained a no-decision as the Cubs came back to win the game, 7–5. Solis would make three other starting pitcher assignments, but his finest outings came in relief. On July 26, he relieved starter Dick Drott in the third inning and then worked 6⅓ scoreless frames to earn his first MLB victory over the Milwaukee Braves, the defending world champions.  Then, on August 10, Solis turned in another lengthy relief effort, replacing John Briggs in the first inning in a game against the St. Louis Cardinals and lasting the final 8⅔ innings while giving up only two earned runs to gain another victory. He was aided by four double plays in that contest.

In 52 Major League innings pitched, Solis surrendered 74 hits and 20 bases on balls; he struck out 15.  He resumed his minor league career in 1959.

References

External links

1930 births
2001 deaths
Baseball players from San Luis Potosí
Chicago Cubs players
El Paso Texans players
Fort Worth Cats players
Houston Buffs players
Major League Baseball pitchers
Major League Baseball players from Mexico
Mexican expatriate baseball players in the United States
Mexican League baseball pitchers
Phoenix Giants players
Rojos del Águila de Veracruz players
San Antonio Missions players
Sultanes de Monterrey players